Cosma Rohilla Shalizi (born February 28, 1974) is an associate professor in the Department of Statistics at Carnegie Mellon University in Pittsburgh.

Life 

Cosma Rohilla Shalizi is of Indian Tamil, Afghan (Rohilla) and Italian heritage and was born in Boston, where he lived for the first two years of his life. He grew up in Bethesda, Maryland.

In 1990, he was accepted as a Chancellor's Scholar at the University of California, Berkeley, and completed a bachelor's degree in Physics.  Subsequently, he attended the University of Wisconsin–Madison where he received a doctorate in physics in May 2001. From 1998 to 2002, he worked at the Santa Fe Institute, in the Evolving Cellular Automata Project and the Computation, Dynamics and Inference group. From 2002 to 2005, he worked at the Center for the Study of Complex Systems at the University of Michigan in Ann Arbor. In August 2006, he became an assistant professor in the Department of Statistics at Carnegie Mellon University in Pittsburgh.

Shalizi is co-author of the CSSR algorithm, which exploits entropy properties to efficiently extract Markov models from time-series data without assuming a parametric form for the model.

Shalizi writes a popular science blog "Three-Toed Sloth".

References

External links
 

1974 births
Living people
University of Wisconsin–Madison College of Letters and Science alumni
Carnegie Mellon University faculty
Cellular automatists
Probability theorists
University of Michigan faculty
Santa Fe Institute people
American academics of Indian descent
Rohilla